Alfred Feargus O'Connor Anthony (22 May 1841 – 10 June 1900) was an English first-class cricketer. He made 3 appearances for Nottinghamshire as a wicket-keeper but, batting down the order, found runs hard to come by against Derbyshire and Yorkshire in May 1875 and, a year later, against Lancashire. He completed 2 catches and 2 stumpings. His nephews George Anthony and Henry Anthony also played for Nottinghamshire.

References

External links

English cricketers
Nottinghamshire cricketers
English cricketers of 1864 to 1889
1841 births
1900 deaths
People from Arnold, Nottinghamshire
Cricketers from Nottinghamshire